Raymond Benedict Bartholomew Michael Asquith, 3rd Earl of Oxford and Asquith,  (born 24 August 1952), is a British former diplomat and hereditary peer. Styled Viscount Asquith until he succeeded to his father's peerage titles on 16 January 2011, the earldom of Oxford and Asquith was created for his paternal great-grandfather, H. H. Asquith, a former prime minister of the United Kingdom.

Early life
Lord Oxford (as he is now known) is the elder son of Julian Asquith, 2nd Earl of Oxford and Asquith, and code breaker Anne Asquith. He was named after his paternal grandfather Raymond Asquith, a scholar and Army officer who was killed in action during the First World War.

He was educated at Farleigh School and Ampleforth College, and obtained a BA and subsequent MA degree at Balliol College, Oxford.

Career
Raymond Asquith joined HM Diplomatic Service in 1980 as a career diplomat, serving until 1997. As well as postings in London at the Foreign and Commonwealth Office and to the Cabinet Office, he served as First Secretary at the British Embassy in Moscow from 1983 to 1985, and Counsellor at HM Embassy in Kyiv from 1992 to 1997. He was First Secretary (Political) and MI6 station commander in Moscow and was personally responsible for exfiltrating the KGB officer and British agent Oleg Gordievsky concealed in his car, an action which resulted in the expulsion from the Soviet Union of himself and 17 Embassy colleagues plus 7 British businessmen in September 1985.

Asquith was appointed an Officer of the Order of the British Empire for "diplomatic services" in 1992. Other family members who served as British diplomats include his father, his brother Sir Dominic Asquith (former British Ambassador to Iraq and Egypt), and his maternal grandfather Sir Michael Palairet.

He is currently a director of Group DF, the Ukrainian holding company of Dmytro Firtash, a Ukrainian oligarch associated with Vladimir Putin and Viktor Yanukovych, who is also accused by the United States Justice Department of involvement with Russian organised crime. Prior to obtaining his peerage, Asquith ran the lobbying firm Asquith & Granovski, which served affluent clients from post-Soviet states, including Firtash.

In October 2014, the Earl of Oxford and Asquith was elected in the House of Lords by-election to replace the late Lord Methuen (who died in July 2014) and to sit as a Liberal Democrat, alongside his cousin Baroness Bonham-Carter of Yarnbury on the government benches (as the Lib Dems were then part of a coalition government) in the House of Lords.

Personal life
In 1978, Asquith married the author and scholar Clare Pollen. The Earl and Countess of Oxford and Asquith have a son and four daughters.

 Mark Julian Asquith, Viscount Asquith (born 13 May 1979)
 Lady Magdalen Katharine Asquith (born 30 December 1981)
 Lady Frances Sophia Asquith (born 1984)
 Lady Celia Rose Asquith (born 1989)
 Lady Isabel Anne Asquith (born 1991)

The son, Mark Julian Asquith styled Viscount Asquith, is heir apparent to the family titles.

The senior branch of the Asquith family has been Roman Catholic since Katharine Asquith (mother of the 2nd Earl) converted after the death of her husband. Lord Oxford's mother was also a Catholic, as is his wife.

References

1952 births
Living people
Earls of Oxford and Asquith
English Roman Catholics
Officers of the Order of the British Empire
Knights of Malta
People educated at Ampleforth College
Alumni of Balliol College, Oxford
British diplomats
Liberal Democrats (UK) hereditary peers
Raymond, 3rd Earl of Oxford and Asquith
Hereditary peers elected under the House of Lords Act 1999